Stephanie Zammit is a Maltese teacher, model and beauty pageant titleholder who was crowned Miss World Malta 2007 and represented Malta at the Miss World 2007 beauty pageant. According to Zammit, she has a Bachelor's degree in Education and is a qualified teacher of English and Home Economics.

References

External links
"Stephanie Zammit, Miss World Malta 2007 official webpage

Miss World 2007 delegates
1985 births
Living people
Maltese beauty pageant winners